Robert M. L. Baker Jr. (born September 1, 1930) is an American physicist. He earned a bachelor's degree in physics at UCLA summa cum laude, was elected to Phi Beta Kappa, and earned a master's degree in Physics and a Ph.D. in engineering at UCLA. The Ph.D. in engineering, with a specialization in aerospace, was, according to UCLA officials, the first of its kind to be granted in the United States. Baker was a lecturer and assistant professor at UCLA, in astronomy (1959–63) and the Department of Engineering and Applied Science (1963–71). During that time he was also a lecturer at the United States Air Force Academy.

While on a two-year tour of active duty in the United States Air Force, he worked on a variety of classified aerospace projects. In 1961, he became the Director of the Lockheed's Astrodynamics Research Center in Bel Air, California. In 1964, Baker joined Computer Sciences Corporation as associate manager for mathematical analysis. In 1980, he was elected President of West Coast University, an accredited university for the adult learner (now operating under the auspices of American Career College in Los Angeles).

After retiring from West Coast University in 1997, Baker became the senior consultant for Transportation Sciences Corporation and Gravwave LLC.

Baker won the UCLA Physics Prize, the Dirk Brouwer Award for outstanding contributions in astrodynamics and orbital mechanics, and the Outstanding Man of the Year Junior Chamber of Commerce award in 1965 presented to him by Ronald Reagan.

See also
 Gravitational wave

References

 Robert M L Baker Jr., "Drag interactions of meteorites with the Earth’s atmosphere," Dissertation submitted in partial fulfillment of the degree of Ph.D. at UCLA, May, 1958.
 R. M L Baker Jr. with M.W. Makemson, An Introduction to Astrodynamics, Academic Press, New York, October, 358 pages, 1960.
 R. M L Baker Jr. and M.W. Makemson, Proceedings of the 1961 International Astronautics Federation. Springer Verlag, Berlin, 1961.
 Robert M L Baker Jr., Astrodynamics: Applications and Advanced Topics, Academic Press, New York, 1967.
 R. M L Baker Jr. and M.W. Makemson, An Introduction to Astrodynamics, 2nd ed, Academic Press, New York, 1967.
 Robert M L Baker Jr., Carl Sagan, and Thorton Page, UFO’s a Scientific Debate, Chapter 8, Cornell University Press, 1972.
 United States Patent Number 6,417,597 B1, “Gravitational Wave Generator,” July 9, 2002. and People's Republic of China Patent Number 10055882.2, September 2, 2005.

External links
 Dr. Robert Baker's home page
 GravWave website

1930 births
Living people
21st-century American physicists
UCLA Henry Samueli School of Engineering and Applied Science alumni
UCLA Henry Samueli School of Engineering and Applied Science faculty